You Broke My Heart in 17 Places is the debut studio album by Tracey Ullman, released in 1983. It peaked at No. 14 on the UK Albums chart and No. 34 in the spring of 1984 on the Billboard 200 in the United States.

The album consists of cover songs, such as Doris Day's "Move Over Darling" and Blondie's "(I'm Always Touched By Your) Presence Dear". "They Don't Know"—originally written, recorded and released by singer Kirsty MacColl—became Ullman's biggest hit, reaching No. 8 on the U.S. Billboard Hot 100, and No. 2 in the UK. The song's music video included a cameo appearance by Paul McCartney, whom Ullman would appear with in McCartney's film Give My Regards to Broad Street.

Track listing

UK Stiff Records LP

US MCA Records LP

1991 Repertoire Records CD bonus tracks

1992 Rhino Records CD bonus tracks
In 1992, the album was included in its entirety on the Rhino Records compilation The Best of Tracey Ullman: You Broke My Heart in 17 Places, along with nine additional tracks.

2006 Stiff/Victor CD bonus tracks

Personnel
Tracey Ullman – vocals
Kirsty MacColl – backing vocals, producer ("You Broke My Heart in 17 Places")
The Sapphires – backing vocals
Flying Pickets – backing vocals
Rosemary Robinson – backing vocals
Miriam Stockley – backing vocals
Clare Torry – backing vocals
Wealthy Tarts – backing vocals
Hank Marvin – guitar ("Move Over Darling" and "You Broke My Heart in 17 Places")
Peter Collins – producer (except "You Broke My Heart in 17 Places" and "Bobby's Girl") for Loose End Productions
Steve O'Donnell – producer ("Bobby's Girl") for Malpas Productions
Gavin Povey – producer ("You Broke My Heart in 17 Places")
Barry Farmer, Gavin Povey, John Burns, Julian Mendelsohn, MD-Wix, Phil Chapman, Phil Harding – engineer

References

External links
 

Tracey Ullman albums
1983 debut albums
Albums produced by Peter Collins (record producer)
Stiff Records albums
MCA Records albums
Covers albums